Dionys Verburg (1655 – 1722), was a Dutch Golden Age landscape painter.

Biography
He was born in Rotterdam and became the father of Rutger and Jan. He worked in Surinam and is known for landscapes. He was a follower of Gerrit Battem.
He died in Rotterdam.

References

Dionys Verburgh on Artnet

1655 births
1722 deaths
Dutch Golden Age painters
Dutch male painters
Landscape painters
Painters from Rotterdam